Turris Turnu Măgurele may refer to:

 CS Dunărea Turris Turnu Măgurele, a dissolved football club in Turnu Măgurele, Romania
 AFC Turris-Oltul Turnu Măgurele, a football club in Turnu Măgurele, Romania